Though I Am Gone (Wo sui si qu) is a 2007 Chinese documentary film directed, written, and edited by Hu Jie. The film centers on Bian Zhongyun, the vice principal of the Girls Middle School attached to Beijing Normal University, who was beaten to death by her students on August 5, 1966 during the Red August of Chinese Cultural Revolution. The film is being distributed in North America by dGenerate Films.

Background

The mass student-led paramilitary social movement was initiated, mobilized and guided by Chairman Mao Zedong in 1966 and 1967. The purpose of launching the "Great Revolution" is to prevent the restoration of capitalism, to maintain the purity of the party, and to determine China's own path in the construction of a socialistic country.

University, high school and middle school students took the leading roles in the development of the "revisionist opposition". In a short period of time, the Red Guards that were established by students swarmed into the schools, wrestled with school staffs, and even some government locations were affected. The movement spread from within the party to the entire country and shortly after, the members of the society began to worry.

Plot summary 
The film is largely based on interviews the deceased woman's husband, Wang Jingyao. Jingyao documented the events leading up to and following his wife's death, including photos of her corpse, using a small 35mm stills camera. He did not witness the process of his wife's death, but the helplessness and sadness that Wang Jingyao felt through the lens of his responses is evident. What the interviewer can do is to record the feelings and the experience of the interviewees truthfully.

The film shows the hidden perspectives, experiences and memories that are buried deeply within normal Chinese citizens during the Maoist periods and the Cultural Revolution through the use of personal and subjective records. The film also illustrates the scale of the terror that was unleashed by listing the 201 names on the screen at the end of film, in a four-minute incomplete roll call of the teachers that were killed in Beijing, China during the August 1966 Cultural Revolution. The list of names act as a reminder to the audience about the wrongful murderous killings by the Red Guards that was encouraged and permitted by Mao during the movement and also to pay respect to those who have tragically died in the violent revolution.

Production 
In an interview with director Hu Jie, the filmmaker stated that it "took a year of negotiations and a viewing of the Lin Zhao film (referring to Hu's 2004 film Searching for Lin Zhao's Soul) to persuade Bian’s aging husband to tell his story and show his photographs for the first time". The film uses a combination of black and white and colour shots. Through the interviewers' narration and perspective, the film gradually uncovers the real events that occurred in the Cultural Revolution at that time. The cinematography technique also objectively reveals the emotions of the autobiographical nature through the narrator's perspective and vision.

Title
The title of the film is derived from a poem in Doctor Zhivago (1957) that was written by the Russian author, Boris Pasternak (1890 - 1960). The last two excepts of Gethsemane's Garden from The Poems of Doctor Zhivago as translated by Christopher Barns:

Reception

Ban in China 
The film is banned in China, where the Communist Party reacted sensitively to the film because "many of the former members of the Red Guard who attended Bian's middle school were members of the families of high-ranking officials that are still revered today."

Critical reception
"One of the Cultural Revolution's most shocking and perplexing cases. We can only imagine how difficult it is for Hu to produce his films; only a committed person who takes what he does as a 'calling' can persist." — Dr. Weili Yu, Yale University, in the journal Asian Educational Media Service 

"Though none of his works have been publicly shown in China, Hu Jie is one of his country's most noteworthy filmmakers." — The New York Review of Books

"A profoundly moving memorial to the victims of Mao's senseless political violence." — ReelTime Arts

"Packs a powerful punch in just over an hour...Director Hue Jie exploys a collage-like approach, interspersing archival footage and propaganda songs with present day interviews with Wang and other survivors of this tragic period of history." — Twitch Film

"Though I Am Gone challenges the authorities; the mainland may have sanctioned other films which broach the so-called '10 years of catastrophe' but Hu's film is still banned." — South China Morning Post

"Hu Jie's body of work puts a human face on some of the worst horrors of the Communist Party's recent history." — Public Radio International

Screenings and awards

Cancellation of YunFest 
Hu Jie's film was actually to be screened at YunFest, "a documentary festival held by the Academy of Social Sciences in south-western Yunnan Province", in 2007 but was promptly "cancelled by the authorities at the last minute".

Further reading 

 Other Documentary Films by Hu Jie
 Generation Independent Movement in Chinese Cinema
 Independent Chinese Documentaries distributed by dGenerate Films

References

External links
 
 China Digital Times link including film clips
Though I Am Gone at Icarus Films

Chinese documentary films
Films about the Cultural Revolution
2000s Mandarin-language films
Chinese independent films
2007 films
2007 documentary films